Michael S. Schmidt (born September 1983) is a two time Pulitzer prize winning American journalist, author, and correspondent for The New York Times in Washington, D.C. He covers national security and federal law enforcement, has broken several high-profile stories. He is also a national security contributor for MSNBC and NBC News. 

Among the major stories he has broken was the existence of Hillary Clinton private email server. During the Trump presidency, he broke several major stories, including about the Mueller investigation, other investigations of Trump and Trump's efforts to overturn the election. 

In 2018, he won two Pulitzer Prizes for his work the previous year. He won one of the Pulitzer Prizes for breaking the news that President Trump had asked the FBI director James Comey for a loyalty pledge, and to close the federal investigation into Michael Flynn. That story led the Justice Department to appoint a special counsel Robert S. Mueller III to investigate President Trump.

With another reporter at the Times, Schmidt won a Pulitzer Prize for a story about sexual harassment allegations against Fox News personality Bill O'Reilly that led to Fox firing O'Reilly. He shared the 2018 Pulitzer Prize for Public Service and the 2018 Gerald Loeb Award for Investigative business journalism for stories on the sexual predator allegations against film producer Harvey Weinstein that led to the rise of the Me Too movement.

In September 2020, Schmidt's first book, Donald Trump v. The United States: Inside the Struggle to Stop a President, was released by Penguin Random House. The book received positive reviews and rose to number three on The New York Times Best Seller list and number two on both Amazon and number two on the Wall Street Journal's best-seller list. 

Earlier in Schmidt's career he was a sports reporter and broke several major stories about doping in baseball including that Sammy Sosa, David Ortiz and Manny Ramirez has tested positive for performance-enhancing drugs.

Early life and education
Schmidt was born to a Jewish family in Nyack, New York. His parents are Rachel and James Schmidt. James Schmidt is a well known wealth manager. Michael Schmidt went to high school at John Randolph Tucker High School in Richmond, Virginia, where he played baseball. He graduated from Lafayette College in Easton, Pennsylvania, in 2005 with an AB in international affairs after co-founding and editing Marooned with classmate Erin Koen.

Career
In 2004, Schmidt worked at The Boston Globe.

Schmidt began working for The Times as a news clerk in 2005. In December 2007, he was made a staff reporter, covering performance-enhancing drugs and legal issues in sports.

In 2009, Schmidt broke the stories that David Ortiz, Manny Ramirez  and Sammy Sosa were among the roughly 100 players who tested positive for a performance-enhancing drug in 2003.

In 2010, Schmidt broke the story about how the firm of baseball super agent Scott Boras had provided tens of thousands of dollars in loans to a young prospect, raising questions about whether Boras' firm had broken rules designed to prevent players from being exploited.

Schmidt was a correspondent for The Times in Iraq in 2011. During his time in Iraq, he uncovered a series of classified documents in a junkyard in Baghdad. The documents were testimony from Marines about the 2005 Haditha Massacre. In that incident, the Marines had killed 26 Iraqi civilians. An Iraqi junkyard attendant had used other classified American documents to cook smoked carp. The story, which ran as American troops were leaving Iraq in 2011, was widely praised.

In May 2015, Schmidt was part of a group of Times reporters who broke a series of stories about the Justice Department charging FIFA executives. Schmidt was in the lobby of a hotel in Switzerland when law enforcement officers arrested the executives.

In December 2015, a New York Times story by Schmidt and Matt Apuzzo (written together with Julia Preston) criticized the US government for missing crucial evidence during the visa vetting process for Tashfeen Malik, who would later become one of the shooters in the 2015 San Bernardino attack. The director of the FBI dismissed the reporting as "garble" and it turned out that rather than having "talked openly on social media about her views on violent jihad" as stated in the article, she had mentioned these in private communications. The New York Times' public editor called for "systemic changes" after these articles by Schmidt and his coauthors (both of which had relied on anonymous government sources).

Schmidt has been one of the Times' lead reporters on the federal and Congressional investigations into connections between Donald Trump's associates and the Russians. On March 5, 2017, Schmidt broke the story that the FBI director James Comey had asked the Justice Department to publicly refute Trump's claims that President Obama had him wire-tapped during the 2016 campaign. Schmidt also broke several other stories about the Trump presidency, including that Trump ordered his chief of staff, John Kelly, to give his son-in-law, Jared Kushner, a security clearance despite wide spread concerns in the intelligence community about Kushner having access to the country's most closely guarded secrets.

Clinton email story 
In March 2015, Schmidt broke the story that Hillary Clinton had exclusively used a personal email account when she was secretary of state. The story said that Clinton "may have violated federal requirements that officials’ correspondence be retained as part of the agency's record." In response to the story, Mrs. Clinton announced that she would release all of her work related emails from her time in office.

After breaking the story, he was the lead reporter covering the Hillary Clinton email controversy. Defenders of Hillary Clinton have said that Schmidt's coverage of her was not fair and he has been frequently criticized by the group Media Matters and other liberals. After breaking the Clinton email story, Media Matters's founder and chairman, David Brock, wrote an open letter to The New York Times about the story, asking for a "prominent correction as soon as possible". The Times did not run a correction. The inspector general for the State Department said in May 2016 that Clinton's use of the account had violated State Department's record keeping policies.

Comey–Trump story 
On May 16, 2017, Schmidt broke the story that James Comey, the former FBI director in the Trump Administration, had written an FBI memo detailing President Donald Trump's alleged ordering of Comey to end the FBI's investigation of Michael Flynn prior to the conclusion of the investigation's findings. The story led the Justice Department to appoint the former FBI director Robert Mueller to investigate Trump, which eventually produced the Mueller report.

Personal life
In April 2022, he married American television host Nicolle Wallace.

References

External links

News articles by Michael S. Schmidt of The New York Times

1983 births
Living people
Jewish American journalists
American male journalists
Journalists from Virginia
Journalists from Washington, D.C.
Lafayette College alumni
People from Rockland County, New York
Writers from Richmond, Virginia
Sportswriters from New York (state)
The Boston Globe people
The New York Times writers
NBC News people
MSNBC people
Gerald Loeb Award winners for Investigative
Pulitzer Prize for National Reporting winners
Pulitzer Prize for Public Service winners
Livingston Award winners for National Reporting